Ulmus 'Wanoux' (selling name ) is a Dutch hybrid cultivar raised at the Dorschkamp Research Institute for Forestry & Landscape Planning, Wageningen, from an open pollination of 'Plantyn'. Originally identified as clone No. 762, it was selected for assessment by the French Institut National de la Recherche Agronomique (INRA), which patented it as 'Wanoux' in 2006.

 was introduced to the UK by the Hampshire & Isle of Wight Branch, Butterfly Conservation, in 2008, as part of its assessment of DED-resistant cultivars as potential hosts of the endangered White-letter Hairstreak.

Description
 is a narrow tree primarily intended for street planting. The glossy, dark-green leaves, < 11 cm long by 8 cm wide, are coarsely toothed and have conspicuous venation. The samarae are sub-orbicular, almost cordate, typically 15 mm long by 13 mm wide, the seed slightly nearer the shallow notch. Towards the end of the season, the leaves suffer from various afflictions and can appear shabby. Leafing is late, but not quite as late as its stablemate . Many minor buds fail to burst, so that young plants are rather sparsely furnished; in combination with the tree's limited lateral development, this can lead to a skeletal appearance.
The tree readily suckers from the roots, notably on chalk.

Pests and diseases
Tests in France by INRA found the tree to be 'highly resistant' to Dutch elm disease, exhibiting the lowest wilting percentage of all the clones trialled, making it comparable with 'Sapporo Autumn Gold'
However, the presence of U. wallichiana in the ancestry of  poses the risk of susceptibility to elm yellows (phloem necrosis), which seriously damaged its Dutch stablemate 'Lobel' used as a control in the Italian elm breeding programme. The clone has also proven susceptible to Coral spot fungus Nectria cinnabarina in the Netherlands.

In trials in southern England, the leaves were found to remain completely free of Black Spot.

Cultivation
 has moderate vigour, attaining a height of 14 m at 20 years of age in France. The tree is reputedly easily propagated from cuttings.  was introduced to North America in 2010, with the supply of two small specimens to the USDA, Washington, D.C., released from quarantine in 2013.  is reported "the most successful so far" (2021) of a 2014 trial planting of elms at Lees Court, Kent. Circa 2020, 300 VADA were planted in the Parc de Sceaux, southern Paris, and 92 planted in the jardin des Tuileries.  is not known to have been introduced to Australasia.

Notable trees
Former French prime minister Lionel Jospin insisted on planting an elm, the tree of the Left when, in keeping with tradition, he was obliged to plant a tree in the garden of the Hôtel Matignon, his official residence in Paris, in 1998. He chose , then still known only by its Dutch trial identity of '762'. The Left, however, does not have a monopoly on elms. 'The Queen's Elm' planted on the main lawn of Holyrood Palace, Edinburgh, near the ruined Holyrood Abbey to mark the Diamond Jubilee of Elizabeth II (2012), is also an Ulmus .

Etymology
The registered cultivar name 'Wanoux' is a contraction of Wageningen and Champenoux, the locations of the Dutch and French research stations. The selling name VADA is the ancient Roman name for the Dutch town of Wageningen, where the clone was raised.

Accessions

Europe
Grange Farm Arboretum, Lincolnshire, UK. Acc. no. 693.
Great Fontley Farm, Fareham, UK. Butterfly Conservation Elm Trials plantation, Home Field: two small trees planted 2008. 
Longstock Park  Arboretum, Longstock, Stockbridge, Hampshire, UK. One small tree planted 2010.
Royal Botanic Garden Edinburgh, UK. Acc. no. 20090115.
Sir Harold Hillier Gardens, Romsey, UK. Acc. no. 2008.0639.
Wijdemeren City Council, Netherlands. Elm collection, used for elm lane 's-Gravelansevaartweg, Loosdrecht

North America
United States National Arboretum, Washington, D.C., US. 2 small trees.

Nurseries
F P Matthews 'Trees for Life' Ulmus LUTECE ('Nanguen'), Tenbury Wells, Worcestershire, UK. Bare-root whips. 
Van Den Berk (UK) Ltd., London, UK. Standards.

References

Ulmus
Ulmus articles with images
Hybrid elm cultivar